Adel Al Mulla (7 December 1970 – 7 May 2022) was a Qatari footballer who played as a forward. He represented the Qatar national team in the 2000 Asian Cup. He also played for Al Rayyan and competed in the men's tournament at the 1992 Summer Olympics.

References

External links

1970 births
2022 deaths
Qatari footballers
Association football forwards
Qatar international footballers
Qatar Stars League players
Al-Rayyan SC players
Al-Arabi SC (Qatar) players
Olympic footballers of Qatar
1992 AFC Asian Cup players
2000 AFC Asian Cup players
Footballers at the 1992 Summer Olympics